Holger Danske, or Ogier the Dane, is a legendary character appearing in medieval chansons de geste.

Holger Danske may also refer to:
Holger Danske (resistance group) a Danish resistance group of World War II
 Holger Danske'' (opera), a 1789 Danish opera with music by F.L.Æ. Kunzen and Jens Baggesen